Tajuria discalis is a species of lycaenid or blue butterfly found in the Indomalayan realm. It was first described by German entomologist Hans Fruhstorfer in 1897.

Subspecies 
The following subspecies have been described:
T. d. discalis Lesser Sunda Islands
T. d. floresica  Murayama, 1983 Flores
T. d. centralis  Morinaka & Shinkawa, 1996 Bali
T. d. triangularis  Morinaka & Shinkawa, 1996 Java

References

Tajuria
Butterflies described in 1897